Adam Davidson (born August 13, 1964) is an American actor and television director from Los Angeles, California.

Life and career
Davidson graduated from Kenyon College in 1986. and from Columbia University School of the Arts in 1994. Davidson has appeared in the following films, The Day Trippers, A Match Made in Heaven, Návrat ztraceného ráje (a.k.a. Return to Paradise Lost), Way Past Cool, Nature Boy and Pop Life. In addition to acting, Davidson has also directed for several television programs which include: Community, Lost, Deadwood, Grey's Anatomy, Six Feet Under and Fringe. He is the son of acclaimed American theatre producer and director Gordon Davidson, who was Jewish.

Accolades
His debut film as a director, The Lunch Date, won the Academy Award for Best Short Subject and the Short Film Palme d'Or at the 1990 Cannes Film Festival.

Director filmography
La Brea (6 episodes, 2021-)
1.03 "The Hunt"
1.06 "The Way Home"
1.10 "Topanga"
2.01 "The Next Day"
2.02 "The Cave"
2.06 "Lazarus"
Ordinary Joe (1 episode, 2021)
1.01 "Way Leads on to Way"
Zoey's Extraordinary Playlist (4 episodes, 2020)
1.02 "Zoey's Extraordinary Best Friend"
1.04 "Zoey's Extraordinary Neighbor"
1.11 "Zoey's Extraordinary Mother"
1.12 "Zoey's Extraordinary Dad"
AJ and the Queen (2020) - episode #4: "Louisville"
Bluff City Law (2019) - episode #2: "You Don’t Need a Weatherman"
Tell Me a Story (2018) - episode #9 "Chapter 9: Deception"
Splitting Up Together (2018) - episode #12 "War of the Wagners"
The Rookie (2018) - episode #2 "Crash Course"
Wisdom of the Crowd (4 episodes, 2017)
1.01 - "Pilot"
1.02 - "Into The Wild"
1.07 - "Trade Secrets"
1.11 - "Alpha Test"
I'm Dying Up Here (6 episodes, 2017-2018)
1.07 "My Rifle, My Pony & Me"
1.10 "Creative Differences"
2.01 "Gone with The Wind"
2.02 "Plus One"
2.05 "Heroes and Villains"
2.10 "Lines Crossed"
Fear The Walking Dead (5 episodes, 2015-2016)
1.01 - "Pilot"
1.02 - "So Close, Yet So Far"
1.03 - "The Dog" 
2.01 - "Monster"
2.02 - We All Fall Down"
Kingdom (2014-2017) TV series
episode 1.01 "Set Yourself on Fire"
episode 1.02 "Glass Eye"
episode 3.05 "Please Give"
episode 3.06 "All Talk"
Turn: Washington's Spies (2014) TV series
episode 1.04 "Eternity How Long"
Rake (2014) TV series
episode 1.06 "Jury Tamperer"
Treme (2011) TV series
episode 2.09 "What is New Orleans?"
Fringe (2010) TV series
episode 2.14 "The Bishop Revival"
United States of Tara (2010) TV Series
episode "The Truth Hurts"
episode "You Becoming You"
Big Love (3 episodes, 2007–2010)
Strange Bedfellows (2010) TV episode
Fight or Flight (2009) TV episode
Rock and a Hard Place (2007) TV episode
Community (4 episodes, 2009–2015)
Wedding Videography (2015) TV episode
Conspiracy Theories and Interior Design (2010) TV episode	
The Art of Discourse (2010) TV episode
Communication Studies (2010) TV episode
Comparative Religion (2009) TV episode
True Blood (1 episode, 2009)
New World in My View (2009) TV episode
Lie to Me (3 episodes, 2009)
Sacrifice (2009) TV episode
Depraved Heart (2009) TV episode
Moral Waiver (2009) TV episode
Kings (1 episode, 2009)
Insurrection (2009) TV episode
The Ex List (1 episode, 2008)
Climb Every Mountain Biker (2008) TV episode
Saving Grace (1 episode, 2008)
A Little Hometown Love (2008) TV episode
Shark (6 episodes, 2007–2008)
Wayne's World 3: Killer Shark (2008) TV episode
Bar Fight (2008) TV episode
In Absentia (2007) TV episode
Gangster Movies (2007) TV episode
Wayne's World 2: Revenge of the Shark (2007) TV episode
Starlet Fever (2007) TV episode
John from Cincinnati (1 episode, 2007)
His Visit: Day Eight (2007) TV episode
Dexter (1 episode, 2006)
Father Knows Best (2006) TV episode
Rome (2005) TV Series
episode 2.04 "Testudo et Lepus"
For Norman... Wherever You Are (2005)
Grey's Anatomy (2005) TV Series
episode 1.04 "No Mans Land"
episode 2.03 "Make Me Lose Control"
episode 2.07 "Something to Talk About"
episode 2.14 "Tell Me Sweet Little Lies"
Life As We Know It (2004) TV Series
Deadwood (2004) TV series
episode 3.09 "Amateur Night"
Lost (2005) TV Series
episode 2.06 Abandoned
LAX (2004) TV Series
episode "Credible Threat"
episode "Out of Control"
Jake 2.0 (2003) TV Series
Monk (2002) TV Series
The Agency (2001) TV Series
The Chronicle" (2001) TV Series
episode "Man and Superman"
episode "Only the Good Die Young"
episode "Tears of a Clone"
episode "What Gobbles Beneath"
Six Feet Under (2001) TV Series
episode 5.10 "All Alone"
The Invisible Man (2000) TV Series
episode 2.18 "The Invisible Woman"
Cover Me: Based on the True Life of an FBI Family (2000) TV Series
Way Past Cool (2000)
Law & Order (1990) TV Series
episode 8.11 "Under the Influence"
The Lunch Date (1989)

References

External links

1964 births
American male film actors
American television directors
Columbia University School of the Arts alumni
Directors of Live Action Short Film Academy Award winners
Kenyon College alumni
Living people
Male actors from Los Angeles
Film directors from California